Akosua Asaa Manu is Ghanaian social marketer and a political activist. She is currently a deputy chief executive officer of the Ghana National Youth Authority. Prior to her appointment she served as the deputy director of communications at the office of the First Lady of Ghana, Rebecca Akufo-Addo.

Early life and education 
Menu had her secondary education at Wesley Girls' Senior High School and then proceeded to the University of Ghana where she obtained a bachelor's degree in economics.

Career 
Starting off her career as a social marketer and a banker, Menu worked with Ghana Commercial Bank(GCB) and Max International. She got recruited to work as a systems and back office administrator at GCB after serving as a national service personal. In 2012, she started a small fashion and clothing business and in 2014, she left GCB to work at Max International. Rising through the ranks to now attaining a diamond associate at Max International, she is known to be one of the successful and influential people in the social marketing industry

Politics 
She is a member of the New Patriotic Party. In 2016, Manu joined the campaign team of the New Patriotic Party working under the social media division. As a result, she was appointed to the office of the First Lady to serve as the deputy Director of Communications in 2017. In that same year, she joined the New Patriotic Party's communication team.

Personal life 
She is married with two children.

References

Living people
University of Ghana alumni
New Patriotic Party politicians
Year of birth missing (living people)